Otto Lauffer (20 February 1874 – 8 August 1949) was a German folklorist and cultural historian.

Life 
Otto Lauffer was born in Weende (which is today is a district of Göttingen) on 20 February 1874 and spent his childhood there, until 1886.

He studied German language and literature studies, history and art history in Göttingen (enrolled on 22 August 1891), Berlin, Munich and again in Göttingen (enrolled 24 April 1894). In 1896 he was awarded his doctorate under the supervision of Moritz Heyne.

In 1902, Lauffer became an assistant at, and in 1907 director of the Historical Museum in Frankfurt. From 1908 until the opening in 1922, he oversaw the building of the Hamburg History Museum (now "hamburgmuseum"), continuing in his role as director until 1946.

In the same year that the University of Hamburg was founded, Otto Lauffer was granted the first professorship in folklore in Germany, which he retained until 1939. In 1922/23, he was also rector of the University.

Lauffer died on 8 August 1949 in Hamburg, and was buried in the Ohlsdorf Cemetery there (grave reference: R9 (29-30)). His collected works are to be found in the Hamburg University Library. On 20 February 1984, a memorial plaque was dedicated to his memory in Weende.

The  in Weende and the Otto Lauffer barge in Hamburg are named after him.

References

External links 

 
 

1874 births
1949 deaths
German folklorists
Cultural historians
Academic staff of the University of Hamburg
German male non-fiction writers
Burials at the Ohlsdorf Cemetery